Keahu Kahuanui (born August 7, 1986) is an American actor and twitch streamer, best known for his portrayal of the recurring character Danny Mahealani in the television series Teen Wolf on MTV.

Early life
Kahuanui was born on August 7, 1986 in Honolulu, Hawaii. His family moved often through his childhood. He resides in Los Angeles. He ran track in high school and university before completing his bachelor's degree at Boston University in international relations after switching from engineering. Kahuanui has worked in the tech industry and has continued to present an interest in science and technology. He speaks German fluently and has demonstrated a competence in Mandarin Chinese.

Kahuanui has stated that he developed an interest in acting as a child and took part in plays, musicals, and commercials.

Filmography

Television

Film

References

External links
 
 
 

21st-century American male actors
Male models from Hawaii
1986 births
Male actors from Honolulu
Boston University College of Arts and Sciences alumni
Living people